Enophrys is a genus of marine ray-finned fishes belonging to the family Cottidae, the typical sculpins. These fishes are found in the northern and eastern Pacific Ocean.

Taxonomy
Enophrys was first proposed as a monospecific genus in 1839 by the English zoologist William John Swainson with its only and type species being Cottus claviger. This species had been described in 1839 by the French zoologist Georges Cuvier from Kamchatka but it was later determined to be a synonym of Cottus diceraus, originally described by Peter Simon Pallas in 1787, also from Kamchatka. The 5th edition of Fishes of the World classifies this genus within the subfamily Cottinae of the family Cottidae, however, other authors classify the genus within the subfamily Myoxocephalinae of the family Psychrolutidae, although others place the subfamily Myoxocephalinae within the Cottidae.

Etymology
Enophrys prefixes phrys, meaning "brow", with en, ning "very", presumed to be a reference to the thick orbital ridge of the type species.

Species
Enophrys contains 4 recognized species within it:
 Enophrys bison (Girard, 1854) (Buffalo sculpin)
 Enophrys diceraus (Pallas, 1787) (Antlered sculpin)
 Enophrys lucasi (D. S. Jordan & C. H. Gilbert, 1898) (Leister sculpin)
 Enophrys taurina C. H. Gilbert, 1914 (Bull sculpin)

Characteristics
Enophrys sculpins share the possesion of plates along their lateral lines and some species have prickly scales underneath the lateral line. They also have a very long, sharp spine on the upper preoperculum and sharp spines on the nose.

Distribution
Enophrys sculpins are only found in the northern and Eastern Pacific Oceans from the Sea of Japan to California.

References

Cottinae
 
Taxa named by William John Swainson